Piotr Lipiński (born 4 January 1979) is a Polish volleyball player, a member of Polish national team in 2001-2003, four-time Polish Champion.

Career

Clubs
He began to play when he was 10. His first coach was Maciej Rejzner. When he was 15 he debuted in AZS Olsztyn. After that, he went to Mostostal SA Kędzierzyn-Koźle. In season 2013/2014 he played for Effector Kielce. In 2014 he went to AZS Politechnika Warszawska.

Sporting achievements
 CEV Champions League
  2002/2003 – with Mostostal SA Kędzierzyn-Koźle
 CEV Challenge Cup
  1999/2000 – with Mostostal SA Kędzierzyn-Koźle
 National championships
 1999/2000  Polish Cup, with Mostostal SA Kędzierzyn-Koźle
 1999/2000  Polish Championship, with Mostostal SA Kędzierzyn-Koźle
 2000/2001  Polish Cup, with Mostostal SA Kędzierzyn-Koźle
 2000/2001  Polish Championship, with Mostostal SA Kędzierzyn-Koźle
 2001/2002  Polish Cup, with Mostostal SA Kędzierzyn-Koźle
 2001/2002  Polish Championship, with Mostostal SA Kędzierzyn-Koźle
 2002/2003  Polish Championship, with Mostostal SA Kędzierzyn-Koźle
 2005/2006  Polish Championship, with AZS Olsztyn
 2006/2007  Polish Championship, with AZS Olsztyn

References

External links 
 PlusLiga player profile

1979 births
Living people
Sportspeople from Olsztyn
Polish men's volleyball players
Polish Champions of men's volleyball
AZS Olsztyn players
Jadar Radom players
ZAKSA Kędzierzyn-Koźle players
BKS Visła Bydgoszcz players
Effector Kielce players
Projekt Warsaw players
Warta Zawiercie players